The Independent or Tongnip Sinmun (독립신문; 1896–1899) was an early Korean newspaper. Tongnip Sinmun was the first privately managed modern daily newspaper in Korea. It was founded in July 1896 by a member of the enlightened Korean intelligentsia, Seo Jae-pil (later known as Philip Jaisohn). It constituted two different language editions: Korean and English. Originally, it was published every other day and developed into a daily newspaper in Korean. The English edition, originally published every other day like the Korean edition, was later only published weekly.
It has been estimated that the paper's average circulation per issue was between two and three thousand copies.

Background
The key figure in the paper's establishment was undeniably Seo Jae-pil. After the failure of the progressive Gapsin Coup in 1884, Seo sought refuge in the United States. In exile he learned from Pak Yeong-hyo that he had been pardoned from the charge of high treason as of March 1895, and further, that his "Gaehwapa" (lit. reformist) comrades had come to power during his exile. As a result, he decided to return to Korea in December of that year. 

In Korea, the Prime Minister, Kim Hong-jip persuaded Seo to join the cabinet as the Oemu hyeoppan (외무협판, the modern equivalent to Minister of Foreign Affairs). However, Seo rejected the proposal, urging grassroots enlightenment to be a more urgent matter than his entry into the national cabinet. Seo viewed the absence of support from the populous as the primary cause of the Gapsin Coup failure. He also judged that the success of the Gabo reform (1894) was reliant solely on the support from the public. In order to achieve this support, it was most imperative to have a progressive newspaper as a vehicle of mass education.

Accordingly, in January 1896 Seo Jae-pil and Yu Gil-chun reached an agreement to establish a non-governmental newspaper company and to publish both Korean and English editions beginning March 1 of that same year. The Kim Hong-jip cabinet backed the plan vehemently. Indeed, the cabinet promised to grant him a fund (300 won a month) from the government budget and even appointed Seo as an advisor to the Jungchuwon (중추원, 中樞院), or Privy Council.

Even though the collapse of the Kim Hong-jip cabinet resulted in the loss of support of such prominent figures as Yu Gil-chun, Seo did receive from the succeeding Pak Jung-yang cabinet re-approval of the plan to establish the newspaper. The Pak cabinet spent 3,000 won plus another 1,400 won for paper's the founding funds and Seo's living expenses respectively. Seo purchased a printer and printing types from Japan. He rented a government-owned building in the Jung-dong district of Seoul, launched the Tongnip Sinmun newspaper company, and published its first edition in April 1896. In short, the Tongnip Sinmun was the result of joint work between Seo Jae-pil and the government under the cabinets of both Kim and Park.

Seo Jae-pil was the chief editor of the newly launched paper. For the editorial sections of both the Korean and English versions, Ju Si-gyeong acted as an assistant editor. At the time it was published, it was a tabloid newspaper (8.6 x 12.9) and was published three times a week (every Tuesday, Thursday and Saturday), comprising 4 pages in total. The first three pages were printed in Korean and the last page, entitled “The Independent”, in English . Unlike existing governmental bulletins, it also covered practical matters. It contents generally included editorials, local items, official bulletins, as well as a digest of domestic and foreign news and miscellaneous information, including advertisements.

Development and discontinuance

The Tongnip Sinmun went through four phases from its start to discontinuance. The first phase was the period from April 7 to July 2, 1896, which was the interval of time between the first publication of the newspaper and the establishment of the Tongnip Hyeophoe (독립협회 , lit. "Independence Club"). During this period the primary focus of the newspaper concerned national enlightenment. Also during this period, the Tongnip Sinmun was very cooperative with the government and provided the reading public with explanations of government policies. Its articles were politically moderate in tone even as it began to exert its influence on national consciousness and thought.

The second phase was from July 4, 1896, to May 11, 1898. This was the period from the establishment of Tongnip Hyeophoe to the point that Seo transferred the Tongnip Sinmun to Yun Chi-ho (윤치호, 尹致昊). During this period, the paper supported Tongnip Hyeophoe-led projects, i.e., the construction of Independence Gate, Tongnip Park and the Tongnipgwan (Independence Hall), and focused its efforts more on grassroots enlightenment. There was also a change in the newspaper format in this period. The English edition was published separately and its content expanded twofold.

The newspaper established branch offices in Jemulpo and Shanghai and stationed correspondents there. In the midst of increasing conflicts between reformists and conservatives within the Korean cabinet, the Tongnip Hyephoe was gradually suppressed by pro-Russia conservatives. In August 1897, the Russian government dispatched a military instructor and a financial adviser to Korea for the purpose of intervention and exploitation. In response to these developments, the Tongnip Sinmun began to criticize the government by reporting on corrupt officials and unjustifiable Russian intervention. In December 1897, the Tongnip Sinmun was faced with discontinuance due to its criticisms of pro-Russia conservatives. Even foreign diplomats pressured Korea's King Gojong to implement censureship controls over the paper when in 1898 it published some secret documents revealing Russian and Japanese plans to exact concessions from the Korean government. Certain elements of the foreign community feared that an active press might interfere with "concession diplomacy" by mobilizing the Korean public against the granting of special privileges to foreign interests. Ultimately, the government decided to expel Seo from Korea and allow the continued publication of the paper under Yun Chi-ho. Though Gojong did prepare laws pertaining to censuring the press, none were actually promulgated.

The paper's third phase extended from the time Yun ascended to the position of chief editor until the dismantling of the Tongnip Hyeophoe (i.e., May to December, 1898) During this period, the Tongnip Sinmun played the role of mouthpiece for the increasingly embattled Tongnip Hyeophoe while also serving to enlighten the people. From July 1898, it began daily publication in Korean (though not in English).

The publication's fourth phase was the period from the dissolution of Tongnip Hyeophoe to the discontinuance of the newspaper itself. After the breakup of the Tongnip Hyeophoe, Yun Chi-ho, the chief editor of the paper and president of Tongnip Hyeophoe, was appointed to an official government position and left Seoul. Thus, changes were inevitable. For the first several months, H.G. Appenzeller assumed the job of chief editor. He was soon followed in this position by H. Emberly in June, 1899. The newspaper tried to maintain its founding principles, however, it toned down its criticism and focused more on education and enlightenment at the grassroots level.

Despite its continued publication, such aforementioned changes, as well as increasing government oppression, naturally led to the paper's loss of dignity as a newspaper. The authorities attempted searching the newspaper offices and arrested journalists who wrote stories on corrupted officialdom. In a bid to purchase the Tongnip Sinmun, the government even demanded the return of the paper's office building in July, 1899. Considering it was operating under debt, this had serious repercussions for the newspaper. In response to these developments, U.S. minister to Korea Horace Allen arranged for mediation between the government and Seo Jae-pil, still a substantial leader behind the scenes. As a result, on December 24, 1899, Seo finally agreed to sell the newspaper to the government for the price of 4,000 won. The Tongnip Sinmun published its final issue on December 4, 1899. After the government takeover the paper was discontinued permanently.

Contents
As far as primary contents were concerned, the Tongnip Sinmun maintained the following focal points:

 Independence, patriotism and national development
 The importance of education and enlightenment
 Democratic values (suffrage and legislature)
 Social reform through promoting public morality and eliminating evil practices
 An emphasis on industrial development
 Promoting social justice based on a law-abiding spirit
 Arousing the people's attention to the international situation

Contribution to Korean society
The Tongnip Sinmun was historic in terms of its contribution to and impact on Korean political and intellectual history. These contributions included:

 The reform of Korean concepts and mindset by providing modern knowledge
 The protection of national interests through criticizing foreign aggression.
 The promotion of Korean language and culture
 Representative of a civil voice through reporting on corrupt officials
 Supporting the Tongnip Hyeophoe’s activities
 Awakening consciousness of the significance of the media in civil and political discourse
 Introducing Korea objectively to the international community

See also
Korean Empire
Gabo Reform
Yu Gil-chun
Seo Jae-pil
Independence Club
Yun Chi-ho
 Syngman Rhee
Kim Kyu-sik
People's joint association
Sinhan Minbo

References

External links
 독립신문 獨立新聞 at the Naver / EncyKorea
Philip Jaisohn Memorial Foundation

Korean-language newspapers
Anti-sadaejuui
Newspapers published in Korea
Korean Empire
Yun Chi-ho
Soh Jaipil
Liberal media
Publications established in 1896